Qiñwani (Aymara qiñwa, qiwña a kind of tree  (polylepis), -ni a suffix, "the one with the qiwña tree", also spelled Kheñwani) is a mountain in the Bolivian Andes which reaches a height of approximately . It is located in the Cochabamba Department, Quillacollo Province, on the border of the Sipe Sipe Municipality and the Vinto Municipality. Qiñwani lies northwest of Yana Qaqa.

References 

Mountains of Cochabamba Department